Caterwaul may refer to:

 the cry of a cat in heat
 Caterwaul (band), American rock band